East Taphouse is a village in Cornwall, England, in the civil parish of St Pinnock,  west of Doublebois on the A390 Liskeard to St Austell road. A little further west are the hamlets of Middle Taphouse and West Taphouse.

References

External links

Villages in Cornwall